Byers is a city in Pratt County, Kansas, United States.  As of the 2020 census, the population of the city was 38.

History
Byers was founded in 1914. It was named for Otto Phillip Byers.

The first post office in Byers was established in April 1915.

Geography
Byers is located at  (37.787830, -98.867114).

Demographics

2010 census
As of the census of 2010, there were 35 people, 15 households, and 9 families residing in the city. The racial makeup of the city was 94.3% White and 5.7% from two or more races.

There were 15 households, of which 26.7% had children under the age of 18 living with them, 46.7% were married couples living together, 6.7% had a female householder with no husband present, 6.7% had a male householder with no wife present, and 40.0% were non-families. 40.0% of all households were made up of individuals, and 26.7% had someone living alone who was 65 years of age or older. The average household size was 2.33 and the average family size was 3.00.

The median age in the city was 43.5 years. 25.7% of residents were under the age of 18; 11.4% were between the ages of 18 and 24; 14.4% were from 25 to 44; 25.8% were from 45 to 64; and 22.9% were 65 years of age or older. The gender makeup of the city was 42.9% male and 57.1% female.

2000 census
As of the census of 2000, there were 50 people, 20 households, and 18 families residing in the city. The racial makeup of the city was 100.00% White. Hispanic or Latino of any race were 8.00% of the population.

There were 20 households, out of which 35.0% had children under the age of 18 living with them, 70.0% were married couples living together, 15.0% had a female householder with no husband present, and 10.0% were non-families. 10.0% of all households were made up of individuals, and 5.0% had someone living alone who was 65 years of age or older. The average household size was 2.50 and the average family size was 2.67.

In the city, the population was spread out, with 30.0% under the age of 18, 4.0% from 18 to 24, 24.0% from 25 to 44, 30.0% from 45 to 64, and 12.0% who were 65 years of age or older. The median age was 37 years. For every 100 females, there were 72.4 males. For every 100 females age 18 and over, there were 84.2 males.

The median income for a household in the city was $18,125, and the median income for a family was $18,125. Males had a median income of $21,250 versus $21,250 for females. The per capita income for the city was $8,461. There were 47.4% of families and 36.7% of the population living below the poverty line, including 18.8% of under eighteens and 100.0% of those over 64.

Education
Byers High School (called the Hornets) became defunct in 1966, after which time its students were bussed to a regional rural community outside Pratt, called Skyline High School.

References

Further reading

External links
 Byers - Directory of Public Officials
 USD 438, local school district
 Byers city map, KDOT

Cities in Kansas
Cities in Pratt County, Kansas
1914 establishments in Kansas